The Women's heptathlon event at the 2013 European Athletics U23 Championships was held in Tampere, Finland, at Ratina Stadium on 13 and 14 July.

Medalists

Results

Final
14 July 2013

Participation
According to an unofficial count, 19 athletes from 13 countries participated in the event.

References

Heptathlon
Combined events at the European Athletics U23 Championships